Franklintown is an unincorporated community in Nassau County, Florida, United States. It is located in the southern half of Amelia Island, on A1A near the Amelia River.

Geography

References

Unincorporated communities in Nassau County, Florida
Unincorporated communities in the Jacksonville metropolitan area
Unincorporated communities in Florida
Amelia Island